Thomas Andrew Gill (January 23, 1887 – March 8, 1947) was an American football, and baseball player and coach of football, basketball, and baseball.

Coaching career
Gill was the head football coach at Lombard College in Galesburg, Illinois in 1912 and at Albion College in Albion, Michigan in 1913. He also coached Albion's baseball team in the spring of 1914. In May 1914, Gill was hired to coach football, basketball, at baseball at University of North Dakota in Grand Forks, North Dakota.

They lost at Vanderbilt, 33–0. A subsequent game against Centre and the remainder of the season were canceled due to the 1918 flu pandemic. Gill's 1919 team was 3–4–1, with wins against Georgetown, 1919 Sewanee Tigers football team and Tennessee and losses to Indiana, Ohio State, Cincinnati and Centre, while tying Vanderbilt, 0–0.

Gill coached the Kentucky Wildcats men's basketball team in 1918–19, finishing with a 6–8 record.

Death and honors
Gill died at the age 60, on March 8, 1947, in Daytona Beach, Florida. He was inducted into the Indiana Football Hall of Fame in 2007.

Head coaching record

College football

References

External links
 
 Andrew Gill's profile at BigBlueHistory.com

1887 births
1947 deaths
American football halfbacks
American football quarterbacks
American women's basketball coaches
Baseball shortstops
Baseball second basemen
Albion Britons baseball coaches
Albion Britons football coaches
Albion Britons men's basketball coaches
Indiana Hoosiers baseball players
Indiana Hoosiers football players
Kentucky Wildcats baseball coaches
Kentucky Wildcats football coaches
Kentucky Wildcats men's basketball coaches
Kentucky Wildcats women's basketball coaches
Lombard Olive football coaches
North Dakota Fighting Hawks baseball coaches
North Dakota Fighting Hawks football coaches
North Dakota Fighting Hawks men's basketball coaches
Saskatoon Quakers (baseball) players
Winston-Salem Twins players
College men's track and field athletes in the United States
High school football coaches in Indiana
People from Linton, Indiana
People from Michigan City, Indiana
People from Washington, Indiana
Coaches of American football from Indiana
Players of American football from Indiana
Baseball coaches from Indiana
Baseball players from Indiana
Basketball coaches from Indiana